

Wigthegn was a medieval Bishop of Winchester. He was consecrated between 805 and 814. He died in 836.

Citations

References

External links
 

Bishops of Winchester
836 deaths
9th-century English bishops
Year of birth unknown